Dinki Mini is a dance and funerary rite from Jamaica. It is mostly performed in the parishes of  Saint Andrew, Saint Mary and Saint Ann.

References 

Jamaican dances